The Purdy Boat Company, of Port Washington, Long Island, New York was one of the most famous makers of custom yachts and racing boats in the 1920s and 1930s.  The name "Purdy" evokes a bygone era of classic race boats and cruisers custom designed and built by James Gilbert Purdy's sons, Ned and Gil Purdy, and their families.  The company and its boats represent an era of New York society comparable to what "Tiffany occupies in the jewelry business."

As T.E. Lawrence (Lawrence of Arabia) wrote in July 1930, "My boat's maker is the Purdy Boat Co . . . and its class name is the Biscayne Baby . . . .  They are the ... best things the States have made, I think."  One of the Purdy Boat Company's most famous works was the Aphrodite, built for multimillionaire John Hay Whitney. "APHRODITE'S guest list over the years reads like a "Who's Who" in the worlds of government, business and entertainment with such luminaries as Fred Astaire, Sir Laurence Olivier, Spencer Tracy, Katharine Hepburn, Henry Ford II, FDR advisor Harry Hopkins and Nelson Rockefeller aboard for summer day cruises down Long Island Sound. APHRODITE also once served as the site for a birthday party for Shirley Temple."

See also
USS Raven III (SP-103) and USS Shadow III (SP-102), both civilian motorboats built by Purdy Boat Company, and used as patrol boats for the United States Navy during World War 1.

References

External links 
 http://zephyrsail.blogspot.com/2006/07/aphrodite-underway.html.
 http://longislandgenealogy.com/Surname_Pages/purdy.htm.
 http://cdm15281.contentdm.oclc.org/cdm4/results.php?CISOOP1=any&CISOFIELD1=CISOSEARCHALL&CISOROOT=/p15281coll63&CISOBOX1=Purdy.

American boat builders